Pavel Byahanski (born 9 January 1981) is a retired Belarusian footballer (forward). He is currently a youth coach at Isloch Minsk Raion.

Career

Coaching career
In February 2016, Buahanski returned to BATE Borisov as a youth coach. In September 2018, he joined Isloch Minsk Raion as a youth coach.

Honours
BATE Borisov
Belarusian Premier League champion: 2002

Zhenis Astana
Kazakhstan Cup winner: 2005

Tobol Kostanay
Kazakhstan Premier League champion: 2010

References

External links
 
 

1981 births
Living people
Belarusian footballers
Association football forwards
Belarusian expatriate footballers
Expatriate footballers in Kazakhstan
Expatriate footballers in Romania
Expatriate footballers in Ukraine
Belarusian expatriate sportspeople in Ukraine
Belarusian Premier League players
Liga I players
Ukrainian Premier League players
FC RUOR Minsk players
FC BATE Borisov players
FC Partizan Minsk players
FC Zhenis Astana players
FC Shakhtyor Soligorsk players
ASC Oțelul Galați players
FC Mariupol players
FC Granit Mikashevichi players
FC Torpedo-BelAZ Zhodino players
FC Tobol players
FC Rechitsa-2014 players
FC Dnepr Rogachev players